Satan's School for Girls may refer to:

Satan's School for Girls (1973 film), TV movie
Satan's School for Girls (2000 film), remake